Morsberg is a hill in the Rhön range in Hesse, Germany.

Hills of Hesse